Abhinaya Krishna is an Indian actor who works in Telugu films and television. Krishna debuted with the drama film Eeswar in 2002. He is working as an anchor, dancer, stand-up comedian.

Filmography

Television
Abhinaya Krishna is popularly known as Adhire Abhi in Jabardasth (comedy show) which telecasts on E TV (India). He worked as creative director for Meelo Evaru Koteeswarudu, the Telugu version of Who Wants to Be a Millionaire?.

He worked as an assistant director under director S. S. Rajamouli for Baahubali 2''.

References

21st-century Indian male actors
Male actors in Telugu cinema
Male actors in Telugu television
Indian male comedians
Telugu comedians
Living people
Year of birth missing (living people)